Atrosalarias holomelas, the brown coral blenny, is a species of combtooth blenny native to coral reefs of the southwestern central Pacific Ocean.

References

holomelas
Fish described in 1872
Taxa named by Albert Günther